Measured Records is a Scottish independent record label which forms part of the hub that is the Measured Group.  Also included are No Half Measures Ltd. (artist management) and Measured Music (publishing).

Based in Glasgow, Measured Records was founded in 2002.  The first release from the label was the single ‘Because You’ by indie pop group the Cosmic Rough Riders in June 2003.  Since then the label has released singles and albums from Cosmic Rough Riders, The Hazey Janes, The Hedrons and Patricia Vonne, and others.

Measured Records is partnered with the independent labels of No Half Measures Ltd. artists such as Wet Wet Wet (Dry Records) and Hue and Cry (Blairhill Records) and provides record label support in all areas or  deals with all aspects of releases including recording, manufacturing, distribution, marketing and promotion.

The management company is involved with the following artists: -
 The group Cosmic Rough Riders,
 The group The Hedrons,
 The group Hue and Cry,
 The group Wet Wet Wet,
 The group The Law.

Companies based in Glasgow